Kelly Renae "Girl" Sutton (born September 24, 1971) is a former NASCAR driver. Sutton started 54 races, mostly in her family-owned No. 02 Chevrolet Silverado, in the Craftsman Truck Series. She was the only stock-car racer, male or female, known to race with multiple sclerosis before Trevor Bayne's diagnosis in 2013.

Beginnings
Sutton began racing at the age of 10 before her career was halted due to her diagnosis of MS at the age of sixteen. She resumed racing in 1992 at Old Dominion Speedway, driving in the Pro Mini Stock Series. During her first year of competition, Sutton won the Hard Charger and Sportsmanship awards. During her three years competing in the series, she won seven feature races and won the Most Popular Driver award all three years.

Return to racing
Sutton would not race again until 1997 in the Allison Pennsylvania Legacy Series. She won two feature races and the Most Popular Driver Award. The next year, she competed in the Parts Pro Truck Series, where she won one qualifying race and the Oral B Close Brush Award.

In 2000, she advanced to the NASCAR Dash Series, where she competed in two races and had a sixteenth-place finish. She posted her first top-ten in the division the following year, before competing full-time in 2002, winning the Most Popular Driver award and finishing third in rookie standings.

Craftsman Truck Series
Sutton made her NASCAR Craftsman Truck Series debut in 2003 at Memphis Motorsports Park, where she started 34th and finished 27th after suffering early transmission failure. She ran three more races that year, her best finish being a 19th at the season-ending Ford 200. She made her first full-time bid for the championship in 2004, with sponsorship from Copaxone. She finished seventh for NASCAR Rookie of the Year honors and 26th in championship points, her best points finish to date. Her best finish that season came at Mansfield Motorsports Speedway, where she finished 20th. She returned in 2005, posting a career-best fifteenth-place run at the Quaker Steak and Lube 200, despite dropping to 29th in points. She had a big accident at Kansas during the season when she went upside down in turns 3 and 4 during the O'Reilly 250 after contact with Chris Fontaine, who had wrecked in front of her earlier.

In 2006, she competed in twelve races. During the O'Reilly 250 at Kansas, the same race she flipped in a year earlier, she had another bad accident, this time losing control of her truck on the backstretch and just missing an opening on the inside wall before slamming into the wall, almost flattening the driver's side of the truck. She was extracted from the truck to a local hospital, but she survived with minor injuries. Fellow NASCAR driver Jeff Fuller would have an accident almost similar to this later in the year in a Busch series race at Kentucky when he spun to avoid a spinning Jason Leffler and slammed into an opening on the inside wall, only it was the passenger side door that was flattened, and he survived with minor injuries. Brad Keselowski was hired to drive in two races that her team was entered in, but that she could not race in due to her injury. Her best finish was a nineteenth at Gateway International Raceway.

For 2007, she drove three races in the No. 51 truck for Billy Ballew Motorsports. In June 2007, Sutton finished 20th at the Toyota Tundra Milwaukee 200, her last race to date.

Motorcycle accident
On Sunday, April 7, 2013, Sutton was severely injured in a motorcycle accident while riding as a passenger.  The person she was riding with died.  She was taken to an area hospital in critical condition.

Motorsports career results

NASCAR
(key) (Bold – Pole position awarded by qualifying time. Italics – Pole position earned by points standings or practice time. * – Most laps led.)

Craftsman Truck Series

References

External links
 
 Kelly Sutton at Racerchicks

Living people
1971 births
People from Crownsville, Maryland
Racing drivers from Maryland
NASCAR drivers
American female racing drivers
People with multiple sclerosis
Sportspeople from Anne Arundel County, Maryland
21st-century American women